The Doctor of St. Pauli is a 1968 West German crime film directed by Rolf Olsen and starring Curd Jürgens, Horst Naumann, and Christiane Rücker.

Plot
In St Pauli, the red light district of Hamburg, a sympathetic Doctor helps treat the poor of the area. His villainous brother, by contrast, is associated with the rich and criminal.

Partial cast

References

External links

 The Doctor of St. Pauli at UCM.ONE

1968 crime films
German crime films
West German films
Films directed by Rolf Olsen
Films set in Hamburg
Films about brothers
Constantin Film films
Terra Film films
1960s German films